The Mocioni family, also spelled as Mocsony de Foen, was an Austro-Hungarian noble family whose members held significant positions within the Kingdom of Romania.

History 
The family was of Aromanian origin, migrating from Moscopole in the Ottoman Empire to the Kingdom of Hungary (and Banat) at the end of the 17th century. As noted philanthropists and bankers, they were awarded with the title of Baron in Austria. They had branches in Romania, Serbia, (Belgrade) and in Hungary, (Budapest).

Notable people
 Alexandru Mocioni (1841–1909)  - writer, journalist, politician, deputy, composer
 Andrei Mocioni (1812–1880) - politician;
 Anton Mocioni (1816–1890) - officer, deputy
 Anton de Mocioni (1882) - minister
 Eugeniu Mocioni (1844–1901) - deputy
 Ecaterina Mocioni -  Baroness of Foeni
 Gheorghe Mocioni (1823–1901) - deputy
 Petru Mocioni (1804–1858 assassinated) - Torontál deputy
 Zeno Mocioni

References
 Lucian Predescu - Enciclopedia României, Cugetarea, Bucharest, 1999.

Austrian people of Aromanian descent
Romanian people of Aromanian descent
Hungarian people of Aromanian descent
Serbian people of Aromanian descent
Hungarian noble families
Austrian noble families
Romanian noble families
People from Moscopole